The 1990 Tour de France was the 77th edition of Tour de France, one of cycling's Grand Tours. The Tour began in Futuroscope with a prologue individual time trial on 30 June and Stage 10 occurred on 10 July with a mountain stage to Saint-Gervais. The race finished on the Champs-Élysées in Paris on 22 July.

Prologue
30 June 1990 — Futuroscope,  (individual time trial)

Stage 1
1 July 1990 — Futuroscope to Futuroscope,

Stage 2
1 July 1990 — Futuroscope to Futuroscope,  (team time trial)

Stage 3
2 July 1990 — Poitiers to Nantes,

Stage 4
3 July 1990 — Nantes to Mont Saint-Michel,

Stage 5
4 July 1990 — Avranches to Rouen,

Stage 6
6 July 1990 — Sarrebourg to Vittel,

Stage 7
7 July 1990 — Vittel to Épinal,  (individual time trial)

Stage 8
8 July 1990 — Épinal to Besançon,

Stage 9
9 July 1990 — Besançon to Geneva,

Stage 10
10 July 1990 — Geneva to Saint-Gervais Mont Blanc,

References

1990 Tour de France
Tour de France stages